The Bonaire national football team is the national football team of the Caribbean island of Bonaire, a public body of the Netherlands.  It is under the control of the Bonaire Football Federation. It became a member of the CFU and an associate member of CONCACAF on 19 April 2013. after which it became a full CONCACAF member on 10 June 2014 The team can participate in the CONCACAF Gold Cup and Caribbean Cup because of their membership in the confederation and sub-confederation. However, Bonaire is not a member of FIFA and therefore can not compete in the FIFA World Cup or other FIFA events.

History
Between 1960 when the Bonaire Football Federation was founded and 1988, a Bonaire selection played over fifty unofficial interinsular matches against Curaçao and Aruba. The first such match was a 0–2 defeat to Curaçao on 7 March 1960.  On 14 January 1987 and 16 January 1991, an amateur Dutch selection played matches against Bonaire on Bonaire while touring the Caribbean. The matches ended in 1–4 and 2–5 defeats, respectively. In June 2008, a Bonaire selection was assembled for a match against NEC Nijmegen as the club held a training camp on the Island. Approximately 1500 spectators attended the match at the Municipal Stadium. The match also marked Lasse Schöne's first appearance for the club.

Until 2010 people from Bonaire competed in confederated football as part of the Netherlands Antilles national football team. After the Netherlands Antilles was dissolved as a unified political entity (a country within the Kingdom of the Netherlands) on 10 October 2010, the five constituent islands took on new constitutional statuses within the Kingdom of the Netherlands. The Netherlands Antilles national team was succeeded by the Curaçao national football team and remained thus a CFU, CONCACAF and FIFA member, while Aruba was already a FIFA and CONCACAF member after registering their own association and leaving the Netherlands Antilles team in 1986. Sint Maarten was also already an independent member of CONCACAF.  Before Bonaire was a member of the CFU or CONCACAF, they competed in the ABCS Tournament, a competition between the Dutch-speaking teams of the Caribbean (Aruba, Bonaire, Curaçao, and Suriname), since its inception in 2010 and were surprise champions in 2011. Bonaire assembled a squad for a match on 28 February 2010 for a friendly against Curaçao, months before the Netherlands Antilles was dissolved. The match ended in a 4–0 victory for Curaçao. Bonaire's first match after the Netherlands Antilles was dissolved was an eventual 2–4 defeat to Suriname in the 2010 ABCS Tournament on 29 October 2010,19 days after the islands gained their new status in the Kingdom of the Netherlands.

On 19 April 2013, Bonaire was accepted as an associate member of CONCACAF  at CONCACAF's XXVIII Ordinary Congress held in Panama City, Panama, a process that took two years. The membership process was delayed when Bonaire's applications to join CONCACAF and the CFU went missing after being sent to president Jack Warner. Around the same time that Bonaire was named an associate member of CONCACAF, it was named a full member of the Caribbean Football Union as the subconfederation's 31st member. Previously, Bonaire was a provisional member before submitting the final paperwork and adjusting the federation's statutes to meet CFU requirements. Bonaire became a full member of CONCACAF at the confederation's next Ordinary Congress on 10 June 2014 in São Paulo, Brazil.

Although Bonaire is not a member, national team player Lacey Pauletta has expressed his desire that Bonaire becomes a FIFA member in the future. FIFA statutes allow only associations of internationally recognised independent countries to become members, as well as entities "which [have] not yet gained independence" provided the "association in the country on which it is dependent" authorizes membership. The requirements of independence or "gaining independence" did not apply to 17 out of the 18 members of FIFA that are not fully independent states, including all 10 Caribbean members, as they entered before the rules were changed. Although the KNVB supports the BFF with training courses, infrastructure, and with goal projects, no express authorization of such a move for Bonaire is reported. Any association seeking affiliation to FIFA must observe FIFA's further regulations related to the subject. In a 2007 independent report on the sports facilities of the BES islands, Bonaire's facilities were described as adequate in number but "substandard" and "hardly maintained", potentially providing a further hurdle to FIFA membership because of the governing body's lengthy stadium recommendations and requirements which include, "...surrounding a football field with a running
track in a modern stadium should be avoided" as part of its stance against multi-purpose stadiums. In 2008, FIFA and the KNVB began a Goal Project on Bonaire, creating two full-sized and one small-sized football pitch with accommodation facilities. An extension of the existing facilities was also part of the project. Goal Projects are part of the Goal Programme which has enabled beneficiary member associations to implement projects designed to develop football in their countries.

It had been announced that Bonaire would host the 2013 ABCS tournament. However, because of financial difficulties, it was later announced that Curaçao would host the tournament between 16 and 18 November.  After initially stating that they would not take part in the tournament at all, Bonaire later announced that they would compete in the tournament. Bonaire went on to play their first match after joining CONCACAF in the tournament, a 0–2 loss to Suriname on 14 November 2013.   The tournament, in which they finished in 3rd place, also saw them record their first victory after joining, a 2–1 victory over Aruba on 16 November 2013, and score their first goal after joining, a 74th-minute strike from Ilfred Piar in the same match.

On 1 June 2014, Bonaire played their first match in a CONCACAF competition, a 2–1 victory over the US Virgin Islands during the preliminary round of 2014 Caribbean Cup qualification. Two days later, Bonaire held Montserrat to a scoreless draw to top their group and advance to face Martinique, Barbados, and Suriname in the second round of qualification. On 10 June 2014, only a few days after their success in the preliminary round of 2014 Caribbean Cup qualification, Bonaire became a full member of CONCACAF. After posting one win and two losses in the next round of qualifying, Bonaire was eliminated from their maiden Caribbean Cup qualifying campaign as Barbados and Martinique advanced from the group. Bonaire came close to qualifying for the next round of qualifying by being the top third place team but were topped by the Dominican Republic who had a superior goal difference of +8 to −8.

In March 2018 it was announced that FFB president Ludwig Balentin met with FIFA president Gianni Infantino to begin the process of gaining FIFA membership. As part of the new agreement, which was supported and facilitated by the KNVB, Bonaire would be invited to future FIFA conferences. Only a few days later, it was announced that Bonaire would take part in the inaugural edition of the CONCACAF Nations League.

In September 2019, Bonaire's application for FIFA membership was denied. A year later, it was announced that the island's football federation was appealing the decision in the Court of Arbitration for Sport and that the proceedings had already begun. Ultimately the appeal was unsuccessful and the CIS ruled in favor of FIFA.

Stadium

Bonaire plays their home matches at the Municipal Stadium, currently named Digicel Kralendijk Stadium for sponsorship reasons,  located in Kralendijk, Bonaire's main city. The stadium has a capacity of 3,000 spectators. In 2006, the cellular phone service provider Digicel donated USD $240,000 to the Bonaire Football Association which was, in part, used to renovate the national stadium. Artificial turf was installed at the stadium, along with the Stadion Antonio Trenidat in Rincon,  in 2012 with financial assistance from FIFA and the Dutch KNVB.

Kit
Bonaire's old kit provider is Dutch sportswear company Masita. Home kits are all yellow with blue piping on the jersey while the away kit is all white with blue piping on the jersey. Both jerseys include the flag of Bonaire on the left breast and the coat of arms of Bonaire on the right.
Bonaire's current kit provider is Dutch sportwear company: Robey Sportwear

Recent fixtures and results

2021

2022

2023

Coaching staff

Manager history

 Arturo Charles (2010–2012)
 Rudsel Sint Jago (2012–2014)
 Ferdinand Bernabela (2014–2015)
 Emmanuel Cristori (2017–2018)
 Robert Winklaar (2018)
 Alexandro Raphaela (2019)
 Brian van den Bergh (2019–present)

Current squad
The following players were called up for the 2022 ABCS Tournament.

Caps and goals correct as of 26 November 2022, after the game against Aruba.

Recent call-ups
The following players have been called up within the last 12 months.

Player records

Players in bold are still active with Bonaire.

Most appearances

Top goalscorers

Competitive record
Key

**Red border color indicates the tournament was held at home.

CONCACAF Gold Cup

CONCACAF Nations League

Caribbean Cup

ABCS Tournament*Draws include knockout matches decided on penalty kicks.Head-to-head recordAs of 26 March 2019, includes matches after CONCACAF acceptance''

References

External links
Official website
CONCACAF Profile
CFU Profile
ELO Ratings
Caribbean Football Database Profile
Bonaire football news

 
Football in Bonaire
Caribbean national association football teams
CONCACAF teams not affiliated to FIFA